Ivan Estill Schottel (October 11, 1921 – August 21, 2000) was an American football player and coach. He played professionally as an end and defensive back with the Detroit Lions of the National Football League (NFL) in 1946 and 1948. Schottel served as the head football at St. Benedict's College—now known as Benedictine College—in Atchison, Kansas from 1953 to 1962 and Northwest Missouri State College—now known as Northwest Missouri State University—in Maryville, Missouri, compiling a career college football coaching record of 80–80–3.

Early life and playing career
Schottel was born in Cosby, Missouri and graduated from King City High School in King City, Missouri. He attended Northwest Missouri State Teacher's College—now known as Northwest Missouri State University—in Maryville, Missouri and pre-flight training at Saint Mary College in Leavenworth, Kansas, where he played for the service team. He joined United States Army during World War II. After the war, Schottel played for professionally for the Detroit Lions of the National Football League (NFL) as an end and defensive back in 1946 and 1948. He appeared in 16 games for the Lions, had four receptions for 147 yards, and scored touchdown. He had a 41.6 yard punting average. An injury in 1948 ended his career.

Coaching career

Benedictine
Schottel was the tenth head football coach at St. Benedict's College—now known as Benedictine College—in Atchison, Kansas, serving for 10 seasons, from 1953 to 1962, compiling a record of 52–36–2.

Northwest Missouri State
Schottel was the 12th head football coach at Northwest Missouri State College—now known as Northwest Missouri State University—in Maryville, Missouri, serving for eight seasons, from 1963 to 1970, compiling a record of 28–44–1.

Head coaching record

College

References

External links
 
 

1921 births
2000 deaths
American football ends
American men's basketball players
Detroit Lions players
Benedictine Ravens football coaches
Northwest Missouri State Bearcats football coaches
Northwest Missouri State Bearcats football players
Northwest Missouri State Bearcats baseball players
Northwest Missouri State Bearcats men's basketball players
College men's track and field athletes in the United States
High school football coaches in Kansas
United States Army personnel of World War II
United States Army soldiers
People from Andrew County, Missouri
People from King City, Missouri
Coaches of American football from Missouri
Players of American football from Missouri
Baseball players from Missouri
Basketball players from Missouri